Minotaur is a Mini-LP from The Clientele. The album was officially announced and titled on 17 July 2010 on the band's official website.

Track listing 
 "Minotaur" – 3:15
 "Jerry" – 3:57
 "As The World Rises and Falls" – 4:59
 "Paul Verlaine" – 3:00
 "Strange Town" – 1:40
 "No. 33" – 1:51
 "The Green Man" – 5:07
 "Nothing Here Is What It Seems" – 2:58
 "One Hundred Leaves" – 4:08 (High Note version bonus track)

References 

2010 albums
The Clientele albums
Merge Records albums